The Istro-Romanian language is a Balkan Romance language, spoken in a few villages and hamlets in the peninsula of Istria in Croatia, as well as in the diaspora of this people. It is sometimes abbreviated to IR.

While its speakers call themselves Rumeri, Rumeni, they are also known  as Vlachs, Rumunski, Ćići and Ćiribiri. The last one, used by ethnic Croats, originated as a disparaging nickname for the language, rather than its speakers.

Due to the fact that its speakers are estimated to be less than 500, it is listed among languages that are "seriously endangered" in the UNESCO Red Book of Endangered Languages.

It is also considered by some Romanian scholars to be an idiosyncratic offshoot dialect of Romanian.

Recent history
There have been many significant challenges facing Istro-Romanians in preserving their language, culture and ethnic identity, including emigration from communism and migration to nearby cities and towns after World War II, when a peace treaty of February 10, 1947, transferred Istria from Italy (which had held it since World War I) and awarded it to Yugoslavia, the parent country of present-day Croatia and Slovenia, which divided Istria between themselves, while Italy still retained a small portion near Trieste.

Before the 20th century, Istro-Romanian was spoken in a substantially broader part of northeastern Istria surrounding the Ćićarija mountain range (ancient Mons Carusadius).
The Istro-Romanians now comprise two groups: the Ćići around Žejane (denoting the people on the north side of Mt. Učka) and the Vlahi around Šušnjevica (denoting the people on the south side of Mt. Učka (Monte Maggiore). However, apart from borrowings from other tongues which vary from village to village, their language is linguistically identical.
There are also several hundred native speakers who live in the United States – not only in Queens, New York (as has been mistakenly believed by some), but throughout the five boroughs of New York City, as well as in upstate New York and the neighboring states of New Jersey and Connecticut; there are also still native speakers in California. There are further groups of native speakers in Italy, Canada, Argentina, Bolivia, Chile, Peru, Venezuela, Sweden, and Australia.

The number of Istro-Romanian speakers has been reduced by their assimilation into other linguistic groups that were either already present or introduced by their respective new rulers of Istria: in the 1921 Italian census, there were 1,644 declared Istro-Romanian speakers in the area, while in 1926, Romanian scholar Sextil Pușcariu estimated their number to be closer to 3,000. Studies conducted in Istria in 1998 (?) by the Croatian linguist August Kovačec revealed only 170 active speakers (but those counted presumably are only those still in villages where the language is actively spoken, thereby excluding those who moved to larger towns in Istria), most of them being bilingual (or trilingual), except for 27 children.

On the other hand, the major northern village Žejane and nearby hamlets at the Slovenian border are less Italianized and more Slavicized. Many villages in the area have names that are of Romanian origin, such as Jeian, Buzet ("lips"), Katun ("hamlet"), Letaj, Sucodru ("under a forest"), Costirceanu (a Romanian name). Some of these names are official (recognized by Croatia as their only names), while others are used only by Istro-Romanian speakers (ex. Nova Vas|Noselo).

Origin
Some loanwords suggest that before coming to Istria, Istro-Romanians lived for a period of time on the Dalmatian coast near the Dinara and Velebit mountains.

August Kovačec (1998) hypothesizes that the Istro-Romanians migrated to their present region about 600 years ago from the territory of present-day Romania, after the Bubonic plague depopulated Istria. This hypothesis is based on chronicles of the Frankopan princes that state that in the 15th century they accepted the migrating Vlachs from the nearby mainland and from the northern part of Krk (Veglia) island, and settled them in isolated villages in Poljica and Dubašnica, between the castles of Dobrinj and Omišalj, and in the port of Malinska. The term "Vlach", however, refers to all Eastern-Romance-language speakers and cannot be associated exclusively with Istro-Romanians. In fact, pockets of Romanian-language speakers persisted in Malinska up to the mid-19th century, they gradually assimilated and their language disappeared with the last speaker, Mate Bajčić Gašparović. Today, few Romance-language toponyms remain in Malinska.

Phonology

Consonants 

  only occurs marginally, or from loanwords.

Vowels 

 Sounds  can also be heard as lower  in other dialects.

Lexis
Although it is a Romance language, Istro-Romanian has received a great amount of influence from other languages. According to a 2005 analysis, 50% of the words in Istro-Romanian come from Serbo-Croatian, 16% come from either Serbo-Croatian or Slovenian, 3% come from Slovenian, 4.7% come from Italian/Venetian, 3.5% come from Old Church Slavonic and only 25% come from Latin.

See also
 Istro-Romanians
 Istro-Romanian alphabet
 Istro-Romanian grammar
 Megleno-Romanian language
 Common Romanian
 Substrate in Romanian
 Balkan sprachbund 
 Origin of the Romanians
 Thraco-Roman 
 Daco-Roman 
 Eastern Romance languages
 Romance languages 
 Legacy of the Roman Empire
 Istriot language

References

Bibliography

External links

 Vrzić, Zvjezdana. 2018. Documentation of the Vlashki/Zheyanski Language ('ruo'). London: SOAS, Endangered Languages Archive

 
Eastern Romance languages
Endangered diaspora languages
Endangered Romance languages
Languages of Croatia
Istria
Severely endangered languages